Walters House may refer to:

in the United States
(sorted by state)
Walters Ranch, Healdsburg, California, listed on the National Register of Historic Places (NRHP) in Sonoma County
Walters-Davis House, Toccoa, Georgia, listed on the NRHP in Stephens County
Daniel and Maude Walters House, Manhattan, Kansas, listed on the NRHP in Riley County
Thomas Walters House, Hodgenville, Kentucky, listed on the NRHP in LaRue County
Dr. Jefferson A. Walters House, Dayton, Ohio, listed on the NRHP in Montgomery County
Paul Londershausen House (also known as the Walters Residence), Dayton, Oregon, listed on the NRHP in Yamhill County
Solomon Walters House, Bruce, South Dakota, listed on the NRHP in Brookings County
Walters House (Morgantown, West Virginia), listed on the NRHP in Monongalia County

See also
Walter House (disambiguation)